Annazette Collins is an American politician. She was a member of the Illinois State Senate from 2011 to 2013, representing the 5th district. She previously was a member of the Illinois House of Representatives, representing the 10th district from 2001 to 2011. During the 2012 Democratic Party primary election, Collins lost to Patricia Van Pelt Watkins. Collins received 46.4 percent of the vote.

Early life
Collins earned her undergraduate degree in sociology and her master's in Criminal Justice from Chicago State University.

Career
Prior to her election as state representative, Collins held various positions in social services and criminal justice agencies. Collins worked as an Administrator of the Chicago Board of Education, a Public Service Administrator for the Illinois Department of Children and Family Services (DCFS), Cook County Social Services, Probation Department, and a Correctional Officer with the Bureau of Prisons.

State Representative
Collins listed her legislative priorities as improving education, expanding access to quality health care, raising the age of majority for juveniles and reforming juvenile justice system.

Ms. Collins co-sponsored FamilyCare, which allows working parents of KidCare-eligible children, to have access to state subsidized health care. Collins worked on legislation to allow patients to sue health maintenance organizations for harmful and delayed medical procedures.

Collins worked to move children out of state custody into family environments whenever possible. She was the chief sponsor of adoption reform legislation allowing godparents and second cousins to adopt children in the custody of DCFS.

Controversy
In July 2008, the Illinois State Board of Elections fined Collins' campaign committee $20,000 and ordered her to issue an apology for filing political finance reports from 2005 to 2007 that reflected the raising, but not spending, of campaign money. The board's orders stemmed from a complaint filed by the Illinois Campaign for Political Reform indicating a lack of contributions or expenditures on her state-mandated campaign disclosure. Collins' campaign committee has corrected 18 of its previously filed reports after the complaint was filed.

Personal life
Collins is married to Keith Langston and they have two daughters, Angelique Nicole and Taylor Kourtnie.

References

External links
Illinois General Assembly – Representative Annazette Collins (D) 10th District official IL House website
Bills Committees
Project Vote Smart – Representative Annazette R. Collins (IL) profile
Follow the Money – Annazette R Collins
2006 2004 2002 2000 campaign contributions
Illinois House Democrats - Annazette Collins profile

Illinois state senators
Members of the Illinois House of Representatives
1962 births
Living people
Chicago State University alumni
Northern Illinois University alumni
Politicians from Chicago
African-American state legislators in Illinois
African-American women in politics
Baptists from Illinois
Women state legislators in Illinois
21st-century American politicians
21st-century American women politicians
21st-century African-American women
21st-century African-American politicians
20th-century African-American people
20th-century African-American women